= Tekirdağ railway station =

Railway station in Tekirdağ, Turkey

Tekirdağ

General information
- Coordinates: 40.9586°N 27.4849°E
- System: TCDD
- Line: Muratlı-Tekirdağ Regional
- Platforms: 1 side platform
- Tracks: 1

Construction
- Structure type: At-grade

History
- Opened: September 1, 2010
Location

Tekirdağ station is a railway station in Tekirdağ. It was opened on September 1, 2010, along with the opening of the Muratlı-Tekirdağ railway.
